The 2020 Pacific FC season was the second in the club's history, as well as second in the Canadian Premier League. In 2019, Pacific finished 5th overall, failing to qualify for the CPL Finals.

On March 20, 2020, the league announced a postponement of the start of the season due to the COVID-19 pandemic.

Current squad
As of August 14, 2020.

Transfers

In

Draft picks 
Pacific FC selected the following players in the 2019 CPL–U Sports Draft on November 11, 2019. Draft picks are not automatically signed to the team roster. Only those who are signed to a contract will be listed as transfers in.

Out

Loans Out

Canadian Premier League

Match times are Pacific Daylight Time (UTC−7).

First stage

Table

Results by match

Matches

Group stage

Table

Results by round

Matches

Statistics

Squad and statistics 

|-
  
 
 
 
 
    
 
  
  
  
   
    
 
 
 
 
  
  
  
|}

Top scorers 
{| class="wikitable sortable alternance"  style="font-size:85%; text-align:center; line-height:14px; width:85%;"
|-
!width=10|Rank
!width=10|Nat.
! scope="col" style="width:275px;"|Player
!width=10|Pos.
!width=80|Canadian Premier League
!width=80|TOTAL
|-
|1|||| Marco Bustos        || MF || 5 ||5
|-
|2|||| Alejandro Díaz         || FW || 3 ||3
|-
|3|||| Victor Blasco         || MF || 2 ||2
|-
|rowspan=5|4|||| Lukas MacNaughton         || DF || 1 ||1
|-
||| Zach Verhoven         || MF || 1 ||1
|-
||| Jamar Dixon || MF || 1 || 1
|-
||| Josh Heard         || MF || 1 ||1
|-
||| Terran Campbell || FW || 1 || 1
|- class="sortbottom"
| colspan="4"|Totals||15||15

Top assists 
{| class="wikitable sortable alternance"  style="font-size:85%; text-align:center; line-height:14px; width:85%;"
|-
!width=10|Rank
!width=10|Nat.
! scope="col" style="width:275px;"|Player
!width=10|Pos.
!width=80|Canadian Premier League
!width=80|TOTAL
|-
|rowspan=1|1|||| Marco Bustos || MF || 3 ||3 
|-
|rowspan=2|2|||| Víctor Blasco || MF || 2 ||2
|-
||| Alejandro Díaz || FW || 2 ||2
|-
|rowspan=6|4|||| Zach Verhoven || MF || 1 ||1
|-
||| Matthew Baldisimo || MF || 1 ||1
|-
||| Jamar Dixon || MF || 1 ||1
|-
||| Kadin Chung || DF || 1 ||1
|-
||| Terran Campbell || FW || 1 ||1
|-
||| Josh Heard || MF || 1 ||1
|- class="sortbottom"
| colspan="4"|Totals||12||12

Clean sheets 
{| class="wikitable sortable alternance"  style="font-size:85%; text-align:center; line-height:14px; width:85%;"
|-
!width=10|Rank
!width=10|Nat.
! scope="col" style="width:275px;"|Player
!width=80|Canadian Premier League
!width=80|TOTAL
|-
|rowspan=2|1|||| Callum Irving        || 1 ||1
|-
||| Nolan Wirth        || 1 ||1
|-
|- class="sortbottom"
| colspan="3"|Totals||2||2

Disciplinary record 
{| class="wikitable sortable alternance"  style="font-size:85%; text-align:center; line-height:14px; width:85%;"
|-
!rowspan="2" width=10|No.
!rowspan="2" width=10|Pos.
!rowspan="2" width=10|Nat.
!rowspan="2" scope="col" style="width:275px;"|Player
!colspan="2" width=80|Canadian Premier League
!colspan="2" width=80|TOTAL
|-
! !!  !!  !! 
|-
|2||DF|||| Kadin Chung    ||1||0||1||0
|-
|3||DF|||| Jordan Haynes    ||2||0||2||0
|-
|7||MF|||| Víctor Blasco    ||2||0||2||0
|-
|8||MF|||| Matthew Baldisimo    ||1||0||1||0
|-
|10||MF|||| Marco Bustos    ||3||0||3||0
|-
|16||MF|||| Zach Verhoven ||1||0||1||0
|-
|20||MF|||| Sean Young ||1||0||1||0
|-
|22||MF|||| Jamar Dixon ||2||0||2||0
|-
|26||DF|||| Thomas Meilleur-Giguère ||1||0||1||0
|-
|- class="sortbottom"
| colspan="4"|Totals||14||0||14||0

References

External links 
Official site

2020
2020 Canadian Premier League
Canadian soccer clubs 2020 season
2020 in British Columbia